The Junkers A50 Junior was a German sports plane of the 1930s.

Development
The Junkers A50 was the first sportsplane designed by Hermann Pohlmann in Junkers works. It had the same modern all-metal construction, covered with corrugated duralumin sheet, as larger Junkers passenger planes. The first flight of the A50 took place on 13 February 1929. It was followed by further four prototypes, in order to test different engines.

Junkers expected to produce 5,000 aircraft, but stopped after manufacturing only 69, of which only 50 were sold.  The high prices probably inhibited sales. Apart from Germany, they were used in several other countries and some were used by airlines. The purchase price in 1930 in the United Kingdom was between £840 or £885. Starting from the A50ce variant, the wings could be folded for easier transport.

Three German A50 took part in the Challenge international touring plane competition in July 1929, taking 11th place (A50be, pilot Waldemar Roeder) and 17th place. Three A50 took part also in the Challenge 1930 next year, taking 15th (A50ce, pilot Johann Risztics), 27th and 29th places. In June 1930 a series of eight FAI world records for altitude, range and average speed were set on a floatplane variant of A50 with the Armstrong Siddeley 59 kW (79 hp) engine. In 1931 Marga von Etzdorf flew an A50 solo from Berlin to Tokyo, the first woman to do so.

Design

Metal construction sports plane, conventional in layout, with low cantilever wings, stressed corrugated duralumin covered. Two-spar wings were folding rearwards or could be detached. Crew of two, sitting in tandem in separate open cockpits (if it flew without a passenger, one cockpit could be closed with a cover). Two-blade propeller. Conventional fixed split axle mainwheel landing gear, with a rear skid.

Variants
A50 - Armstrong Siddeley Genet  radial engine
A50ba - Walter Vega  radial engine (one built)
A50be - Armstrong Siddeley Genet  engine
A50ce -  Armstrong Siddeley Genet II  engine or for export Genet Major I 74 kW, folding wings
A50ci - Siemens-Halske Sh 13,  radial engine, folding wings. Originally designed to be mass-produced as a "Volksflugzeug".
A50fe - Armstrong Siddeley Genet II,  engine, modified airframe, folding wings
KXJ1 - A single Junkers A-50 supplied to the Imperial Japanese Navy Air Service for evaluation.

The -ce and -ci variants were produced in the largest numbers with about 25 of each on the German civil register.
Due to their construction, the A50 were durable aircraft and they lasted long in service. The last plane was used in the 1960s in Finland. There is one A50 preserved in Deutsches Museum in Munich and another in Helsinki airport. One A50 (VH-UCC, c/n3517) is in airworthy condition in Australia.

Operators

Argentine Air Force

Royal Australian Air Force

Bolivian Air Force - 3 A50s transferred from Lloyd Aéreo Boliviano during Chaco War
Lloyd Aéreo Boliviano - 3 A50s used for training and light transport

Brazilian Air Force

Finnish Air Force

Reichswehr

Luftwaffe

Hungarian Air Force

Imperial Japanese Navy

Paraguayan Air Force

Portuguese Air Force

South African Air Force
South African Airways operated three aircraft

Swedish Air Force

Swiss Air Force

Royal Air Force

Uruguayan Air Force

Surviving aircraft
An example is currently on display in Helsinki Airport. Registered as OH-ABB, it was flown by Väinö Bremer to Cape Town in a historic flight.

Specifications (A50ba)

See also

References

Bibliography
 Andersson, Lennart. "Chinese 'Junks': Junkers Aircraft Exports to China 1925-1940". Air Enthusiast, No. 55, Autumn 1994, pp. 2–7.

External links

 Junkers A50 

1920s German sport aircraft
A50
Low-wing aircraft
Single-engined tractor aircraft
Aircraft first flown in 1929